Paleontology, palaeontology or palæontology (from Greek: paleo, "ancient"; ontos, "being"; and logos, "knowledge") is the study of prehistoric life forms on Earth through the examination of plant and animal fossils. This includes the study of body fossils, tracks (ichnites), burrows, cast-off parts, fossilised faeces (coprolites), palynomorphs and chemical residues. Because mankind has encountered fossils for millennia, paleontology has a long history both before and after becoming formalized as a science. This article records significant discoveries and events related to paleontology that occurred in the year 1978.

Expeditions, field work, and fossil discoveries
 A paleoanthropological team led by Mary Leakey found 3.5 million year old human footprints.
 Baby hadrosaurs were discovered in the Two Medicine Formation.

Invertebrates

Maurits Lindström, described the earliest known octocoral in Sweden shifting the first known appearance from the Cretaceous to the Ordovician.

Fish

Newly named Ray-finned fish

Dinosaurs

Newly named dinosaurs
Data courtesy of George Olshevsky's dinosaur genera list.

General research
Peter M. Galton published a paper on Fabrosauridae, including redescribing Fabrosaurus, Echinodon and Nanosaurus along with naming Lesothosaurus.

Birds

{| border="0" style="background:transparent;" style="width: 100%;"
|-
!width="90%"|
!width="5%"|
!width="5%"|
|-
|style="border:0px" valign="top"|

Pterosaurs

Popular culture
 Dinosaur Planet by Anne McAffrey was published. This novel was about a planet called Ireta that was populated by dinosaurs transplanted there by aliens attempting to preserve Earth's Mesozoic biosphere. Paleontologist William A. S. Sarjeant has praised the intelligent pterosaurs descended from Quetzalcoatlus in the novel as plausible.

References

 
8
Paleontology 8